Giacomo Scarpelli (born 23 May 1956), son of Furio Scarpelli, is an Italian scholar in History of Philosophy and screenwriter.

Early life
Scarpelli was born in Rome, Italy. He obtained a Ph.D. in Philosophy at the University of Florence, and carried out further research and studies in England and the United States.

Career
Scarpelli is a Fellow of the Royal Geographical Society and the Linnean Society of London and teaches History of Philosophy at the University of Modena and Reggio Emilia. He is the author of books about philosophy and science, including: Il Cranio di Cristallo. Evoluzione della specie e spiritualismo (1993), Il dio solo. Alle origini del monoteismo (1997), La scimmia, l’uomo e il superuomo. Nietzsche: evoluzioni e involuzioni (2008), Ingegno e congegno. Sentieri incrociati di filosofia e scienza (2011). He also published the essay "Hippos e Homo", about natural philosophy of horse (in "Passaggi", ed. by B. Cavarra e V. Rasini, 2011), and he edited works by Kant, Darwin, Bergson.

As a screenwriter, he served his apprenticeship with his father Furio Scarpelli. With the screenplay of Il Postino (The Postman, 1994) he earned an Oscar nomination  as well as a nomination at the British Academy of Film and Television Arts. He wrote script for Ettore Scola: Romanzo di un giovane povero (1995) and La Cena (1998) (both winner of Grolla d'oro at the Festival of St. Vincent) and Concorrenza Sleale (2001, Unfair Competition) (Flaiano Prize). Other scripts by Giacomo Scarpelli are: Tempo di uccidere (1989, Time to Kill, directed by Giuliano Montaldo, starring Nicolas Cage), Testimone a rischio (1997, An eyewitness account, directed by Pasquale Pozzessere), Opopomoz (2003, a cartoon directed by Enzo D’Alò) N. Io e Napoleone (2006, directed by Paolo Virzì), Christine Cristina (2009), the first film directed by Stefania Sandrelli and Tormenti (2011), from the graphic novel by his father Furio Scarpelli.

Notes

External links

1956 births
Writers from Rome
Italian screenwriters
Italian male screenwriters
Italian male non-fiction writers
20th-century Italian historians
University of Florence alumni
Academic staff of the University of Modena and Reggio Emilia
Living people
21st-century Italian historians
Ciak d'oro winners